The Chugach National Forest is a  United States National Forest in south central Alaska. Covering portions of Prince William Sound, the Kenai Peninsula and the Copper River Delta, it was formed in 1907 from part of a larger forest reserve. The Chugach includes extensive shorelines, glaciers, forests and rivers, much of which is untouched by roads or trails. It hosts numerous bird, mammal and marine species, including extensive shorebird habitat and a bald eagle population larger than the contiguous 48 states combined. Human industry in the forest includes extensive tourism and some mining and oil and gas operations.

History

The area that is now Chugach was settled by the Alutiiq thousands of years ago. It was first visited by Europeans in the mid-1700s and soon settled by Russian fur traders, who trapped the native sea otters. In 1867, the US purchased Alaska from Russia and gold was found in 1888. In 1907, the Chugach National Forest was created from a portion of forest reserve, which had been one of the first of its kind, designated in 1892.

Geography

It is located in the mountains surrounding Prince William Sound including the eastern Kenai Peninsula and the delta of the Copper River. It is the second-largest (third-largest if the Humboldt-Toiyabe National Forest is considered as one entity) forest in the U.S. national forest system, and is the northernmost and westernmost national forest. Approximately 30 percent of the area of the forest is covered by ice. Portions of the Kenai Peninsula make up approximately 21 percent of the forest, and include the southern portion of the Iditarod National Historic Trail. Parts of Prince William Sound make up about 48 percent of the forest. Portions of the Copper River Delta cover approximately 31 percent of the forest, and include the "largest contiguous wetlands complex on North America's Pacific coast".

The supervisor's office is located in Anchorage. There are local ranger district offices located in Cordova, Girdwood, and Seward.

In descending order of land area within the forest, it is located in parts of the Valdez-Cordova Census Area, Kenai Peninsula Borough, Anchorage Municipality, Matanuska-Susitna Borough, Kodiak Island Borough, and Yakutat City and Borough.

Islands 
Green Island is within the Chugach National Forest north of Montague Island in Prince William Sound, Alaska. There are at least three islands named "Green Island" within Alaska. 

Gravina Island is also in the Chugach.

Ecology

The Chugach is a temperate rain forest in the Pacific temperate rain forest region. Here the forest occupies only a very narrow strip between the ocean and the icy alpine zone. The dominant trees are limited to Sitka spruce, western hemlock and mountain hemlock. This zone is known as the "sub-polar rainforest".

The Kenai Peninsula section of the forest is home to over 200 colonies of seabirds, as well as between 3,000 and 5,000 bald eagles. Approximately the same number of eagles live in the Chugach National Forest as live in the entire contiguous United States. The Copper River Delta portion of the forest is the largest contiguous portion of the Western Hemisphere Shorebird Reserve Network and is "considered one of the most essential shorebird habitats in the world". The Delta provides habitat for over 20 million birds annually, and during the summer, one quarter of the world's trumpeter swans and dusky Canada geese call the Delta home. Mammals that inhabit this forest include coyote, timber wolf, moose, caribou, marten, Sitka black-tailed deer, mountain goat, black bears and grizzly bears. Dall sheep are also found; the Chugach is the only national forest where these animals can be seen. Humpback whales, sea lions and otters are found in the Chugach's waters. The waters around the forest also host all five species of Pacific salmon found in North America: chinook salmon, sockeye salmon, coho salmon, chum salmon and pink salmon.

Human impacts

There is very little logging done in the Chugach, and less than 2 percent of the forest is considered suitable for commercial logging operations; this is unusual among national forests. Instead, the forest infuses money into local communities through tourism, recreation, mining and commercial fishing. There are over 7 million annual visitors to the Chugach National Forest, including kayakers, boaters, hikers, skiers, birders and anglers. None of the area is designated as national wilderness, although much of it qualifies under federal law. Mining, including coal and hard rock operations, and oil and gas development are found in the forest. In 2003, the Department of the Interior announced that  of forest was no longer open to mining, adding that area to almost  that had been previously placed off limits. The affected land borders the Kenai National Wildlife Refuge Wilderness, and the department cited protecting the Russian River and upper Russian Lake Recreation Corridor as the reason for the change.

Gallery

See also 
 Tongass National Forest

References

External links

U.S. Forest Service site: Chugach National Forest
A History of the U.S. Forest Service in Alaska

Temperate Rainforests of the North Pacific Coast

Kenai Mountains-Turnagain Arm National Heritage Area
National Forests of Alaska
Protected areas of Anchorage, Alaska
Protected areas of Chugach Census Area, Alaska
Protected areas of Copper River Census Area, Alaska
Protected areas of Kenai Peninsula Borough, Alaska
Protected areas of Kodiak Island Borough, Alaska
Protected areas of Matanuska-Susitna Borough, Alaska
Protected areas of Yakutat City and Borough, Alaska